Letitia Byrne (1779–1849) was a British engraver.

Life
She was born on 24 November 1779, presumably in London, being the third daughter of William Byrne, engraver, and the sister of Anne Frances Byrne. As a pupil of her father, she exhibited landscape-views at the academy when she was only twenty, in 1799.

In 1810 she etched the illustrations for A Description of Tunbridge Wells and four views for Hakewill's History of Windsor. She exhibited From Eton College Play-fields at the academy in 1822; and had other pictures there (twenty-one in all) down to 1848. Her work was included in Cadell & Davies Britannia depicta.

She died 2 May 1849, aged 69, and was buried at Kensal Green.

References

Attribution

External links

1779 births
1849 deaths
British engravers
British women artists
Women engravers